Henry W. Lowcock (c. 1837 – 1901) was an English businessman in Hong Kong and member of the Legislative Council of Hong Kong.

Early Years 
Lowcock was born in Middlesex, England in about 1837.

Career 
He joined Gibb, Livingston & Co., a prominent trading firm in Hong Kong and China, and became a partner in July 1868 following the retirement of Edward Ford Duncanson and William Henry Gibb.

Lowcock was appointed to the Police Inquiry Commission in 1871 and was subsequently appointed to the Legislative Council of Hong Kong on 26 February 1872 as an interim replacement for Richard Rowett, who was on leave. He was re-appointed to the Legislative Council on 23 January 1875 upon Rowett's resignation. He was a Trustee of St. John's Cathedral. He retired from Gibb, Livingston & Co. on 31 March 1882.

Personal life and family 
Lowcock married Annie Loftus Russell on 7 June 1873 at St John's Cathedral, Hong Kong. According to her inscription on their shared gravestone in Wimbledon, London, "our only child" was Henry Christopher, buried in Hong Kong. He was born and died on 31 May 1874, according to his gravestone in Happy Valley cemetery, HK. Henry had 3 other children by at least one other woman. They were named George, Charles and Kwok Yau Tak.

Lowcock was one of the earliest supporters of the Diocesan Home and Orphanage (now the Diocesan Boys' School, Hong Kong). Some of his sons and grandsons later attended the school.

He and Annie settled in the UK after his retirement from Gibb and Livingston Co. He died on 31 July 1901 in Wimbledon, Surrey.

George Lowcock's daughter Edith married Sir Robert Kotewall, a member of the Executive and Legislative Councils of Hong Kong.

George's other son Henry married Mabel Kotewall, daughter of Robert Kotewall's brother Samuel. Henry Lowcock served in the No.320 Maintenance Unit of the Royal Air Force during the Second World War, and was killed in a shop accident in Karachi. His son, Sidney James Lowcock, was the seventh headmaster of Diocesan Boys' School from 1961 to 1983.

References

1837 births
1901 deaths
British expatriates in Hong Kong
English Anglicans
Hong Kong Anglicans
Hong Kong businesspeople
Members of the Legislative Council of Hong Kong
19th-century English businesspeople